Athanasios Georgios "Thanasis" Androutsos (born 6 May 1997) is a Greek professional footballer who plays as a right back or a midfielder for Super League club Olympiacos and the Greece national team.

Club career

Olympiacos
On 18 August 2016, Androutsos made his debut with the club in a European match for UEFA Europa League playoffs against Portuguese club Arouca as a late substitute. On 4 December 2016, he made his debut in the Super League as a late substitute in a 4–0 home win against Levadiakos. On 11 February 2017, he scored after 14 seconds, his first goal in the Super League in a 2–0 home win against AEL.

On 30 August 2019, Androutsos signed a long season deal with Atromitos on loan from Olympiacos. On 6 October 2019, he scored his first goal with Atromitos in a 2–3 away win against Volos.

Androutos returned to Olympiakos in the summer of 2020, after the season-loan to Atromitos, but from mid-July, he entered the squad on 21 November 2020. He played for less than 10 minutes in the 1-0 derby game against rivals Panathinaikos. Until then, from the management that had been done to him, it was clear that in coming transfer period, he would transfer to another club. Among those clubs, the Dutch club VVV-Venlo offered him a contract, but since then he has played in a total of 19 games over a period of four months and also secured a new contract, until the summer of 2023.

International career
On 15 March 2017, as an Olympiacos' youngster Androutsos' international call in Greece national football team was a big surprise by Michael Skibbe for Greece's crucial qualifier against Belgium. On 15 May 2018, he eventually made his debut in a 2-0 away loss in Seville against Saudi Arabia.  On 6 May 2021, he scored his first goal with Greece, with a right footed shot from the centre of the box to the high centre of the goal, giving a 2-0 lead in a friendly game against Norway sealing a 2-1 away win.

Career statistics

Club

International

Honours
Olympiacos
Super League Greece: 2016–17, 2020–21, 2021–22

References

External links

1997 births
Living people
Association football midfielders
Greece youth international footballers
Greece under-21 international footballers
Greece international footballers
Super League Greece players
Super League Greece 2 players
Olympiacos F.C. players
Olympiacos F.C. B players
Atromitos F.C. players
Footballers from Athens
Greek footballers